The New Zealand Men's National Wheelchair Basketball Team is the wheelchair basketball side that represents New Zealand in international competitions for men as part of the International Wheelchair Basketball Federation.

Current roster
The team's current roster for the 2014 Wheelchair Basketball World Championship is

Head coach:  Murray Mackay

Competitions
The New Zealand men's team has not competed at the Wheelchair Basketball World Championship or at the Summer Paralympics.

Wheelchair Basketball World Championship

Asia Oceania Zone

References

External links
 

National men's wheelchair basketball teams
Wheelchair basketball
National mens